Zenithoptera is a genus of dragonfly. They occur in Central America and northern South America. Their habitat is grassy marshes or clearings.

Species
The genus contains the following species:

References

Libellulidae
Anisoptera genera
Taxa named by Edmond de Sélys Longchamps